The 1928 UCI Road World Championships took place in Budapest, Hungary.

Events summary

References

 
UCI Road World Championships by year
W
R
R